David Quinn (born 1971 in Dublin) is a painter and contemporary Irish artist.

Career
Quinn studied Visual Communications at Dublin Institute of Technology (DIT) from 1989 to 1993. Quinn has been exhibiting regularly with the Taylor Galleries, Dublin since 2004. His work is included in the collections of Electric Ireland, Bank of Ireland, Office of Public Works, Eaton Corporation, AIB Corporate Banking and the Morrison Hotel, Dublin.  In 2015 he was the recipient of the Tony O'Malley Studio Residency Award.

He has had solo exhibitions in Dublin, Belfast, Sydney, London, Brussels and Tokyo.

References

External links
David Quinn website
Purdy Hicks website 
 Rossicontemporary website
 Gibbons & Nicholas website

Painters from Dublin (city)
1971 births
Living people

Irish contemporary artists